Bicyclus elishiae is a butterfly in the family Nymphalidae. It is found in Gabon, south‐eastern Cameroon and the south‐western parts of the Republic of Congo.

References

Elymniini
Butterflies described in 2015
Butterflies of Africa